Extremypena is a genus of moths of the family Erebidae. The genus was erected by Martin Lödl in 1994.

Species
The genus includes the following species:
 Extremypena extremipalpis
 Extremypena subvittalis

Extremypena may also be considered a synonym of Hypena Schrank, 1802.

References

Hypeninae